The 2022 CFL Global Draft was a selection of non-Canadian and non-American players by Canadian Football League (CFL) teams that took place on May 3, 2022. It was the second CFL Draft that pools all of the global players together after previously having separate drafts for Mexican players and European players in 2019. 27 players were chosen from among eligible players following the CFL Combine in March. Similar to the previous year's draft, this was a snake draft with the even-numbered rounds being the reverse order of the odd-numbered rounds.

The draft was streamed on CFL.ca and was hosted by Marshall Ferguson and the CFL's Head of Football Operations, Greg Dick.

Waiver priority order
The order of the draft was determined by a weighted lottery system and be based upon the waiver priority (reverse standings from 2021), as opposed to the random lottery order from the 2021 CFL Global Draft. The weighted lottery was determined based on the waiver priority order below:

Draft order

Round one

Round two

Round three

Trades
In the explanations below, (D) denotes trades that took place during the draft, while (PD) indicates trades completed pre-draft.

 Edmonton ←→ Hamilton (PD). Edmonton traded the second overall selection in this draft, Kyle Saxelid, and Grant McDonald to Hamilton in exchange for the ninth overall selection in this draft, along with the eighth and 28th overall selections in the 2022 CFL National Draft.

See also
2022 CFL Draft

References
Trade references

General references

Canadian College Draft
2022 in Canadian football
CFL Global Draft